Thibault Gouti (born February 27, 1987) is a French mixed martial artist who competes in the Lightweight division of Bellator MMA. A professional since 2011, he has also competed in the UFC.

Mixed martial arts career

Early career
Gouti was amassed a record of 11–0 prior signed by UFC with notable win over former UFC fighter Anton Kuivanen.

The Ultimate Fighter 22
Gouti was selected as one of the contestants on The Ultimate Fighter 22 in 2015 and he lost during the entry round by split decision.

Ultimate Fighting Championship
On February 27, 2016, Gouti faced Teemu Packalen, replacing  Łukasz Sajewski, at his UFC debut at UFC Fight Night: Silva vs. Bisping.  He lost the fight in the first round.

His next fight came four months later on June 18, 2016, facing Olivier Aubin-Mercier, at UFC Fight Night: MacDonald vs. Thompson. He lost the fight via submission in round three.

Gouti faced Chad Laprise on August 27 at UFC on Fox: Maia vs. Condit and lost via a technical knocked out.

Gouti was expected to face Dong Hyun Kim on June 11 at UFC Fight Night: Lewis vs. Hunt. However, the  bout was cancelled due to fall ill on the day of the fight.

At his third fight in UFC, Gouti was up against Andrew Holbrook on September 2, 2017 and  secured  his first UFC win at UFC Fight Night: Volkov vs Struve.

Gouti faced Sage Northcutt on February 18, 2018, at UFC Fight Night 126. He lost the fight by unanimous decision.

Gouti faced Nasrat Haqparast on October 27, 2018, at UFC Fight Night 138. He lost the fight via unanimous decision.  This fight earned him the Fight of the Night award.

Since his last bout, Gouti was released from his UFC contract.

Post UFC 
Gouti faced Mehdi Baghdad for the LTDE Super Lightweight belt on July 2, 2021, at Trophee des Etoiles 15. Gouti won the bout via TKO in the first round.

He then faced Ghiles Oudelha at French Fighting Championship 1 on September 25, 2021. He won the fight via split decision.

He was expected to face Emil Weber Meek at Ares FC 2 on 11 December 2021. Gouti however pulled out of the bout due to injury.

Gouti faced Abner Lloveras on March 12, 2022, at War of Titans 2. He won the bout via TKO stoppage in the first round.

Bellator MMA 
Gouti faced Lewis Long on May 6, 2022, at Bellator 280. He won the bout via unanimous decision.

After the victory, Gouti was signed to a multi-fight deal.

Gouti faced Alfie Davis on October 29, 2022, at Bellator 287. He lost the bout via unanimous decision.

Gouti is scheduled to face Kane Mousah on May 12, 2023, at Bellator 296.

Championships and accomplishments
Ultimate Fighting Championship
Fight of the Night (One time)

Personal life
Gouti was a competitive squash player who ranked 191 in the world in 2006.

Gouti's nickname "GT" is his initials spelled backwards.

Gouti earned a bachelor's degree in France.

Mixed martial arts record

|-
|Loss
|align=center|16–6
|Alfie Davis
|Decision (unanimous)
|Bellator 287
|
|align=center|3
|align=center|5:00
|Milan, Italy
|
|-
|Win
|align=center|16–5
|Lewis Long
|Decision (unanimous)
|Bellator 280
|
|align=center|3
|align=center|5:00
|Paris, France
|
|-
|Win
|align=center|15–5
|Abner Lloveras
|TKO (punches)
|War of Titans 2
|
|align=center|1
|align=center|2:49
|Madrid, Spain
|
|-
|Win
|align=center|14–5
|Ghiles Oudelha
|Decision (split)
|French Fighting Championship 1
|
|align=center|3
|align=center|5:00
|Miramas, France
|
|-
|Win
|align=center|13–5
|Mehdi Baghdad
|TKO (punches)
|Trophee des Etoiles 15
|
|align=center|1
|align=center|N/A
|Aix-en-Provence, France
|
|-
|Loss
|align=center|12–5
|Nasrat Haqparast
|Decision (unanimous)
|UFC Fight Night: Volkan vs. Smith 
|
|align=center|3
|align=center|5:00
|Moncton, New Brunswick, Canada
|
|-
|Loss
|align=center|12–4
|Sage Northcutt
|Decision (unanimous)
|UFC Fight Night: Cowboy vs. Medeiros 
|
|align=center|3
|align=center|5:00
|Austin, Texas, United States
|
|-
|Win
|align=center|12–3
|Andrew Holbrook
|TKO (punches) 
|UFC Fight Night: Volkov vs. Struve
|
|align=center|1
|align=center|4:28
|Rotterdam, Netherlands
|
|-
|Loss
|align=center|11–3
|Chad Laprise
|TKO (punches)
| UFC on Fox: Maia vs. Condit 
|
|align=center|1
|align=center|1:36
|Vancouver, British Columbia, Canada
|
|-
|Loss
|align=center|11–2
|Olivier Aubin-Mercier 
|Submission (rear-naked choke)
|UFC Fight Night: MacDonald vs. Thompson 
|
|align=center|3
|align=center|2:28
|Ottawa, Ontario, Canada
|
|-
|Loss
|align=center|11–1
|Teemu Packalén
|Submission (rear-naked choke)
|UFC Fight Night: Silva vs. Bisping 
|
|align=center|1
|align=center|0:24
|London, England
|
|-
|Win
|align=center|11–0
|Anton Kuivanen 
|KO (punch)
|Cage 33
|
|align=center|3
|align=center|1:08
|Helsinki, Finland
|Won Cage Lightweight Championship
|-
|Win
|align=center| 10–0
|Mikael Nyyssönen
|KO (punches)
|Cage 27
|
|align=center|1
|align=center|0:53
|Helsinki, Finland
|Lightweight debut
|-
|Win
|align=center|9–0
|Cedric Severac
|Submission (anaconda choke)
|rowspan=2|Gladiator Fighting Arena 
|rowspan=2|
|align=center|2
|align=center|1:32
|rowspan=2|Nimes, France
|Won GFA Welterweight Championship
|-
|Win
|align=center|8–0
|Ramon Boixader
|TKO (punches)
|align=center|1
|align=center|1:23
|
|-
|Win
|align=center|7–0
|Jorge Giner 
|Submission (rear-naked choke)
|PFC 6
|
|align=center|1
|align=center|2:32
|Marseille, France
|
|-
|Win
|align=center|6–0
|Sofiane Benchohra
|Decision (unanimous)
|Fightway Challenge 8 
|
|align=center|2
|align=center|5:00
|Marseille, France
|
|-
|Win
|align=center|5–0
|Baptiste Atcher
|Submission (rear-naked choke)
|PFC: Challengers 6 
|
|align=center|1
|align=center|1:32
|Marseille, France
|
|-
|Win
|align=center|4–0
|Mikhail Zapoulaev
|Submission (triangle choke)
|PFC 5: Clash of the Titans
|
|align=center|1
|align=center|4:13
|Marseille, France
|
|-
|Win
|align=center|3–0
|Mohamed Bekadar
|Submission (rear-naked choke)
|Fightway Challenge 7 
|
|align=center|1
|align=center|2:34
|Marseille, France
|
|-
|Win
|align=center|2–0
|Jeremy Alary
|Decision (unanimous)
|Fight Impact
|
|align=center|2
|align=center|5:00
|Alzonne, France 
|
|-
|Win
|align=center| 1–0
|Damien Velours
|Submission (rear-naked choke)
|PFC: Challengers 4 
|
|align=center|2
|align=center|1:04
|Marseille, France
|

See also

 List of current Bellator MMA fighters
 List of male mixed martial artists

References

External links

French male mixed martial artists
Sportspeople from Toulouse
1987 births
Living people
Lightweight mixed martial artists
Ultimate Fighting Championship male fighters
French sportspeople in doping cases
Doping cases in mixed martial arts